This is an incomplete record of the players who have played in the Cronulla-Sutherland District Rugby Football League and then gone on to represent a professional team in rugby.

Clubs

Aquinas Holy Family Colts
NONE

Bundeena Bushrangers

Como-Jannalli Crocodiles

Cronulla-Caringbah

De La Salle

Engadine Dragons

Gymea Gorillas

Heathcote Rams
NONE

Kurnell Stingrays
NONE

Menai Roosters

St John Bosco

St Josephs

St Patricks

Sutherland Loftus United

Taren Point Titans
NONE

Yarrawarrah Tigers

State Of Origin Representatives

New South Wales
Jonathon Docking; Andrew Ettingshausen; Robbie Kearns; Cliff Lyons; Mark McGaw; Greg Pierce; Steve Rogers; Sean Ryan

Queensland
Martin Lang; Mat Rogers

Numbers by Club
31 De La Salle
22 Cronulla-Caringbah
19 Engadine Dragons
18 Gymea Gorillas
10 Como Jannali
10 Sutherland Loftus United
4 St John Bosco; St Patricks
3 Menai Roosters; Yarrawarrah Tigers
1 St Josephs
0 Aquinas Holy Family Colts; Bundeena Bushrangers; Heathcote Rams; Kurnell Stingrays; Taren Point Titans

See also

References

CSDRFL players
Sydney-sport-related lists